George Mortimer Kelson (8 December 1835 – 29 March 1920) was an English amateur cricketer, fisherman and author who played for Kent County Cricket Club in the 19th century.

Kelson was born in Sevenoaks in 1835. His father was a doctor and Kelson's early life was "comfortable". He made his first-class cricket debut for Kent in July 1859 in a county match against Sussex, going on to become a key member of the Kent side of the 1860s. He was described in The Times and his Wisden obituary as having been "beyond question the best bat in the Kent eleven" at a time when the best Kentish players would not play regularly for the county side. When batting he was described as "a fine punishing player with a free attractive style" and as "a brilliant field and a fairly good change bowler". He played 69 times for Kent, scoring 1,810 runs and taking 41 wickets for the county side which he captained occasionally. His only century came against Surrey in 1863.

As well as playing for Kent, Kelson also appeared a number of times of the amateur Gentlemen of Kent side as well as playing for the Gentlemen against the Players and for England sides during the 1860s. He played his final first-class match in 1873.

Away from cricket, Kelson was described as a "great fisherman" a "a great horseman, shot, (and) pigeon-racer". He was the fishing editor of Land and Water and wrote widely on the subject, authoring a number of books including The Salmon Fly, considered an important work on salmon flies by some and by some others as developing a pseudoscience around angling with flies.  A new edition of his work, The Essential Kelson, was published in 2011. He died at Surbiton in the Royal Borough of Kingston upon Thames in 1920 aged 85.

References

External links

1835 births
1920 deaths
English cricketers
Kent cricketers
Gentlemen of Kent cricketers
Non-international England cricketers
North v South cricketers
Gentlemen cricketers
Gentlemen of the South cricketers
Surrey Club cricketers
Married v Single cricketers